Ganton railway station was a minor railway station serving the village of Ganton, North Yorkshire, England, on the York to Scarborough Line and was opened on 5 July 1845 by the York and North Midland Railway. In order to speed up traffic on the line, most of the intermediate stations including Ganton were closed to passenger traffic in 1930. Accordingly, it closed to passenger traffic on 22 September 1930, and was finally closed to goods traffic in 1964.

References

External links
 Ganton station on navigable 1947 O. S. map

Disused railway stations in North Yorkshire
Railway stations in Great Britain opened in 1845
Railway stations in Great Britain closed in 1930
Former York and North Midland Railway stations
George Townsend Andrews railway stations
Ganton